The Civil-Military Cooperation Centre of Excellence (CCOE) is an international military organization founded to support NATO's transformation program. As part of the NATO Centres of Excellence programme the CCOE was established in 2001.

CIMIC 
CIMIC (Civil-military co-operation) describes the cooperation of military and civilian actors in the different theatres, which is becoming more important after the end of the Cold War.

Mission and task 
The Mission of the CCOE is, to collect and concentrate expertise concerning CIMIC from all parts inside NATO to find and implement new approaches. For this the CCOE cooperates with different actors like the Helmut Schmidt University of the Bundeswehr in the City of Hamburg and its German counterpart the Zentrum Zivil-Militärische Zusammenarbeit der Bundeswehr (ZentrZMZBw).

Structure 
The CCOE is led by a Directorate. The Planning and Coordination (P&C) Branch plans and coordinates all internal and external activities of the CCOE and is responsible for customer relations. The Concepts, Interoperability and Capabilities (CIC) Branch creates studies, analyses and advises in regard to NATO CIMIC, contributes to the further development of NATO CIMIC policy and delivers Subject Matter Expertise (SME). The Training and Education (T&E) Branch conducts courses and supports customers in the field of education and training Support (SPT) Branch enables the other Branches to deliver their products and gives internal support.

External links 

 Official website of the CCOE

Civil affairs
NATO agencies
Organisations based in The Hague
Organizations established in 2001